Charles Sumner Moore (January 8, 1857 – July 20, 1915) was an American businessman and politician in the state of Oregon. A native of the Pacific Northwest state, he held several elected offices in Klamath County in the southern part of the state, including county judge. A Republican, he served as Oregon State Treasurer from 1899 to 1907.

Early life
Charles Moore was born in the Willamette Valley in Marion County, Oregon, on January 8, 1857, to William S. and Margaret Octavia Moore (née Meldrum). He received his primary education at the public schools of Oregon City and Salem before enrolling in college. Moore attended Willamette University in Salem from 1872 to 1874.

In 1874, he began working at the Klamath Indian Reservation in Southern Oregon, remaining until 1877. That year Moore worked for his father in Klamath Falls assisting in the construction of the first saw mill in that community. After briefly studying law in Portland, he returned to Southern Oregon. In 1878, he entered the retail industry as a store clerk, keeping that position until 1886. He married Mary L. Langell of Jacksonville, Oregon, in 1884, and they had two sons. From 1886 to 1899 Moore managed and was part owner of a mercantile. He also helped build the first electricity plant in Klamath Falls during the 1890s with his brother Rufus.

Political career
In 1880, Moore earned his first elected office as a school clerk for the Linkville School District (now Klamath Falls). He then served as a school director before winning a seat on the first board of trustees for the town of Klamath Falls. Moore served as county judge of Klamath County from 1894 to 1898. His father had been the first county judge when the county was created in 1882. He was a delegate to the Republican National Convention in 1896.

In 1898, he was elected to the office of Oregon State Treasurer. Elected as a Republican, he replaced fellow Republican Phil Metschan who had served two terms. Moore won re-election in 1902 and served in office from January 9, 1899 until January 14, 1907, when George A. Steel took office. Politically he was against the initiative and referendum, but for the gold standard.

Later years
After leaving office he returned to his business pursuits which included timber and banking. He also served on the board of directors for insurance company Oregon Life. He and his brother Rufus were large land owners in Klamath County. Charles Moore died in Portland on July 20, 1915, at the age of 58.

References

External links
Oregon State Treasury Administrative Overview
Fifty Years In Oregon

1857 births
1915 deaths
People from Marion County, Oregon
Politicians from Klamath Falls, Oregon
Willamette University alumni
State treasurers of Oregon
Oregon Republicans
County judges in Oregon
19th-century American politicians